Gasmata Rural LLG is a local-level government (LLG) of West New Britain Province, Papua New Guinea.

Wards
01. Amio
02. Poronga
03. Tesopol
04. Akolet
05. Aigon
06. Kasuilo
07. Asirim

See also
Gasmata

References

Local-level governments of West New Britain Province